The FIBA Europe Under-18 3x3 Championships (and FIBA Europe Under-17 3x3 Championships since 2021) is an under-17/under-18 3x3 basketball competition between FIBA Europe members. The event was held for the first time in Minsk, Belarus in 2015 and has been held annually ever since.

In the championship there are 2 events, men's and women's. Each team has 4 players (3 on court, 1 bench), aged fewer than 18 years. The match is played on a half court and every rule applies as well as a 12-second shot clock and clearance needed on a new possession.

Results

Men's tournament

Women's tournament

Statistics

Medal table

See also 
 FIBA 3x3 Europe Cup
 FIBA 3x3 Under-18 World Championships

References

External links
Official website

 
Basketball competitions in Europe between national teams
Youth 3x3 basketball
3x3 basketball competitions
Europe
Recurring sporting events established in 2015
2015 establishments in Europe